Thomas Vincent (May 1634 – 15 October 1678) was an English Puritan minister and author.

Life
Thomas Vincent, the second son of John Vincent and elder brother of Nathaniel Vincent (both also prominent ministers), was born at Hertford in May 1634. After passing through Westminster School, and Felsted grammar school in Essex, he entered as a student at Christ Church, Oxford, in 1648, matriculated 27 February 1651, and graduated B.A. 16 March 1652, M.A. 1 June 1654, when he was chosen catechist. Leaving the university, he became chaplain to Robert Sidney, 2nd Earl of Leicester. In 1656 he was incorporated at Cambridge. He was soon put into the sequestered rectory of St. Mary Magdalene, Milk Street, London (he was probably ordained by the sixth London classis), and held it till the Uniformity Act of 1662 ejected him.

He retired to Hoxton, where he preached privately, and at the same time assisted Thomas Doolittle in his school at Bunhill Fields. During 1665, the year of the Great Plague of London, he constantly preached in parish churches.

His account of the plague in God's Terrible Voice in the City by Plague and Fire, 1667, is graphic; seven in his own household died as a result of the plague. Subsequently, he gathered a large congregation at Hoxton, apparently in a wooden meeting-house, of which for a time he was dispossessed.

He was among the signers of the 1673 Puritan Preface to the Scots Metrical Psalter. He did not escape imprisonment for his nonconformity. He died on 15 October 1678, and was buried (27 October) in the churchyard of St Giles-without-Cripplegate. His funeral sermon was preached by Samuel Slater.

He is referenced as a main character featured in "The Living," by Anthony Clarvoe, a play about 1665 plague London.

Published works
His publications were:
 A Spiritual Antidote for a Dying Soul (1665).
 God's Terrible Voice in the City (1667).
 Of Christ's Certain and Sudden Appearance to Judgment.
 The Foundation of God standeth Sure (1668) against William Penn.
 Defence of the Trinity, Satisfaction by Christ, and Justification of Sinners.
 Wells of Salvation Opened, (1669).
 The Only Deliverer from the Wrath to Come! Fire and Brimstone in Hell, to Burn the Wicked (1670) 
 An Explanation of the Assembly's Shorter Catechism. (1675) 
 The True Christians Love to the Unseen Christ.
  A Sermon on Isa. Ivii. 1, 2.)
 Holy and Profitable Sayings (1680), posthumous broadsheet.

Notes

References

External links

Attribution

English Presbyterian ministers of the Interregnum (England)
Ejected English ministers of 1662
English non-fiction writers
Christianity in London
17th-century English writers
17th-century English male writers
1634 births
1678 deaths
English male non-fiction writers